Magnus Isaksson (born January 16, 1987 in Piteå, Sweden) is a professional Swedish ice hockey player. He is currently playing for IF Björklöven in HockeyAllsvenskan.

References

External links

1987 births
Living people
Swedish ice hockey centres
Luleå HF players
People from Piteå
Sportspeople from Norrbotten County